Seveso-Baruccana railway station is a railway station in Italy. Located on the Saronno–Seregno railway, it serves the hamlet of Baruccana, in the municipality of Seveso.

Services
Seveso-Baruccana is served by line S9 of the Milan suburban railway network, operated by the Lombard railway company Trenord.

See also
Milan suburban railway network

References

External links

Railway stations in Lombardy
Milan S Lines stations
Railway stations opened in 2012